Oedipina tomasi is a small, lungless salamander in the family Plethodontidae. This critically endangered amphibian has only ever been observed in the Cusuco National Park in Honduras. Very few specimens have been observed in the wild.

Etymology 
The specific name tomasi honors JR McCranie's assistant Tomas, who was instrumental during the lengthy expedition that led to this species' discovery.

Description 
This species description is based on one male holotype and one female paratype, which suggest sexual dimorphism of body size, with males being smaller than females, despite the low sample size. Oedipina tomasi have dark black bodies with small, pale flecks along their backs, and have a snout to vent length of 57.5 millimeters.

Habitat and conservation 
This salamander has only been observed between 1780 and 1800 meters above sea level, in the wet sand on the banks of the Cusuco River in the Cusuco National Park. Loss of genetic diversity due to low population size and deforestation pose the largest threats to this species.

References 

tomasi
Amphibians of Honduras
Endemic fauna of Honduras
Amphibians described in 2006